Bill George Ramos (born April 6, 1956) is a Democratic member of the Washington Legislature representing the State's 5th House district for position 1. Ramos has held office since 2019 after being elected in 2018 and re-elected in 2020. Ramos is endorsed by The Seattle Times newspaper.

Career
Prior to serving in the Washington State House of Representatives, Ramos was a member of the Issaquah City Council from 2016 to 2018.

Ramos won election to the State House on November 6, 2018 from the platform of the Democratic Party. He secured fifty-two percent of the vote while his closest rival Republican Chad Magendanz secured forty-eight percent.

Ramos won re-election to the State House on November 3, 2020.

References

Ramos, Bill
Living people
21st-century American politicians
1956 births